Emanuel Ion Cățe (born 30 July 1997) is a Romanian basketball player for U BT Cluj-Napoca of the Liga Națională and the Romanian national team.

Professional career
In April 2018, Cățe declared for the 2018 NBA draft. During the 2019-20 season, he averaged 6.6 points and 3.5 rebounds per game. On 13 June 2020 Cățe re-signed with UCAM Murcia.

On July 3, 2022, he signed with U BT Cluj-Napoca of the Liga Națională.

International career
Cățe plays for the Romanian national basketball team, which he participated with at the EuroBasket 2017. At age 20, he appeared in five of the six group stage game of Romania, averaging 10.6 minutes and 1.0 point per game.

References

External links
ACB profile 
FEB.es profile 

1997 births
Living people
Basketball players from Bucharest
CB Murcia players
CB Prat players
Centers (basketball)
CS Universitatea Cluj-Napoca (men's basketball) players
Liga ACB players
Real Betis Baloncesto players
Real Madrid Baloncesto players
Romanian expatriate basketball people in Spain
Romanian men's basketball players